The Third Eye is a Norwegian crime drama television series, which stars Kyrre Haugen Sydness, Ida Elise Broch and Marte Engebrigtsen.  The first season was broadcast in 2014 and the second season in 2016.

Plot

Season 1
For about 4 years ago, Norwegian police officer Viggo Lust experienced one of parents worst nightmares; his daughter, Christina has simply vanished. But Viggo can't let go of the old case, and tries on the same time to find out the truth of what really happened to his daughter.

Season 2
2 years after the setting of the first season, police investigator Viggo Lust is back on duty, after the loss of his daughter, Christina. Now, he is doing his best to investigate crimes with his colleagues in the part of the Oslo police.

Series overview

Episodes

Season 1 (2014)

Season 2 (2016)

Cast
Kyrre Haugen Sydness as Viggo Lust
Ida Elise Broch as Mari Friis
Marte Engebrigtsen as Sofie
Eivind Sander as Ståle Bragermoen
Endre Hellestveit as Kårstein Omvik

References

External links
 Filmfront
 
 TV 2 Sumo

Television shows set in Oslo
Norwegian drama television series
Serial drama television series
2010s Norwegian television series
2014 Norwegian television series debuts
2016 Norwegian television series endings